Rich Amiri is an American rapper, singer, and songwriter from Boston currently signed to Internet Money Records and 10K Projects.

Career 
Rich Amiri began freestyling at the lunch table in school but didn’t record for the first time until he had access to his friends’ makeshift studio, which consisted of Apple headphones and GarageBand. He initially gained traction with his inaugural record “For Me,” and eventually gained more recognition with the release of his track “Relocate.” In December 2021, he released his track “Walk In".

In 2022, he released tracks “Can’t Die,” “Ruthless,” “Geneva," with peers like Slump6s (“Havoc”) and Iayze (“Jumpin”). In 2023, Amiri released the single "Poppin," featuring Lil Tecca, ahead of his upcoming album Evolution.

Musical style 
Rich Amiri cites Lil Tecca, Speaker Knockerz, Lil Keed, and YoungBoy Never Broke Again as his influences.

Discography

Studio albums 

 Evolution (2023)

References 

African-American male rappers
21st-century American male musicians
People from Boston
Rappers from Boston

Living people

2000s births
Year of birth uncertain